United States v. Tingey, 30 U.S. (5 Pet.) 115 (1831), was an early United States Supreme Court case held on appeal from the circuit court of the United States for the District of Columbia, which recognised that the United States Government has a right to enter into a contract without relying on any specific legal mandate for authorisation.

The case involved Commodore Thomas Tingey who, with others, had acted as surety for a bond executed on 1 May 1812 by Lewis Deblois, a naval purser.

References

External links
 

United States federal law
1831 in United States case law
United States Supreme Court cases
United States Supreme Court cases of the Marshall Court